Super Warren MMIV is the debut studio album from YACHT, released on States Rights Records in 2003.

Track listing

References

External links

2004 debut albums
States Rights Records albums
Yacht (band) albums